France competed at the 2006 Winter Olympics in Turin, Italy. France is represented by the National Olympic Committee of France (French: Comité national olympique et sportif français).

Medalists

Alpine skiing 

Men

Women

Note: In the men's combined, run 1 is the downhill, and runs 2 and 3 are the slalom. In the women's combined, run 1 and 2 are the slalom, and run 3 the downhill.

Biathlon 

Men

Women

Bobsleigh

Cross-country skiing 

Distance

Sprint

Jean-Marc Gaillard was suspended due to health reasons for the first five days of competition after recording too high values of haemoglobin in his blood.

Figure skating 

Key: CD = Compulsory Dance, FD = Free Dance, FS = Free Skate, OD = Original Dance, SP = Short Program

Freestyle skiing

Nordic combined 

Note: "Deficit" refers to the amount of time behind the leader a competitor began the cross-country portion of the event. Italicized numbers show the final deficit from the winner's finishing time.

Short track speed skating

Skeleton

Snowboarding 

Halfpipe

Note: In the final, the single best score from two runs is used to determine the ranking. A score in parentheses indicates a run that was not counted.

Parallel GS

Key: "+ [time]" represents a deficit; the parentheses indicate the results of each run.

Snowboard cross

References and notes

External links
 Official site for the 2006 France Olympic Team
 

Nations at the 2006 Winter Olympics
2006
Winter Olympics